Players and pairs who neither have high enough rankings nor receive wild cards may participate in a qualifying tournament held one week before the annual US Open.

Seeds

Qualifiers

Draw

First qualifier

Second qualifier

Third qualifier

Fourth qualifier

References
1997 US Open – Men's draws and results at the International Tennis Federation

Men's Doubles Qualifying
US Open (tennis) by year – Qualifying